The 1964–65 NBA Season was the 19th season of the National Basketball Association.  The season ended with the Boston Celtics winning their 7th straight NBA Championship, beating the Los Angeles Lakers 4 games to 1 in the NBA Finals.

Season recap

Preseason

The season marked real change for the league. NBA Commissioner Maurice Podoloff, who had held the office since the formation of the league (as the Basketball Association of America) in 1946, retired. Walter Kennedy took over his position. Bob Cousy, the Boston Celtic star, had retired also.

Regular season

Red Auerbach's loaded Boston Celtics won 62 of 80 games in the nine team league. The balanced Celts had seven ten-point scorers plus the defense and rebounding of Bill Russell. Boston led the league in both of those team stats.

Four other teams won half their games or better. The Los Angeles Lakers won the West Division with 49 wins in 80 games behind superstars Elgin Baylor and Jerry West. The Cincinnati Royals won 48 of 80 games with their own two superstars, Oscar Robertson and Jerry Lucas. The St. Louis Hawks had seven ten-point scorers also and won 45 of 80 games, but lost star Bob Pettit to knee injury. The Philadelphia 76ers won half of their 80 games while working Wilt Chamberlain into their scheme. Chamberlain joined the team in mid-season right after the all-star game, a move which instantly made the new 76ers contenders.

Playoffs

East 
The NBA had six playoff teams that year, with the second and third place teams from each division, East and West, meeting in the first round. The winners of this play-in round would then meet the division winners to decide the finalists.

Cincinnati, which had no real center, could not deal with Chamberlain, so Philadelphia advanced three games to one. But the 76ers, despite three All Stars alongside their giant star, could not unseat the champion Celtics, who held off Philly by a single point in Game 7 when John Havlicek stole the ball in the final seconds.

West 
In the West, which produced no NBA champions from 1959–1970, Baltimore upset the injured St. Louis Hawks to meet Los Angeles. The Lakers overcame the Bullets' three 20-point scorers to meet Boston in the Finals.

Finals 

It was the fourth time the two teams had met in the Finals since 1958.
Laker star Elgin Baylor was lost to a knee injury just five minutes into the playoffs. The Lakers had no answer for Bill Russell inside as well. But Laker star Jerry West courageously tried to keep his team alive by averaging over 40 points through the Lakers 11 playoff games.
The balance and depth of Boston was too much for that.

Notable occurrences 
 The 1965 NBA All-Star Game was played at the Kiel Auditorium in St. Louis, Missouri, with the East beating the West 124–123. Jerry Lucas of the Cincinnati Royals won the game's MVP award.
 ABC started televising the Sunday afternoon Game-Of-The-Week.
 General Motors began a sponsorship deal with the NBA, rotating among all six of its divisions (Chevrolet, Pontiac, Oldsmobile, Buick, Cadillac and GMC Truck). This status continued through .

Final standings

Eastern Division

Western Division

x – clinched playoff spot

Playoff bracket

Statistics leaders

Note: Prior to the 1969–70 season, league leaders in points, rebounds, and assists were determined by totals rather than averages.

NBA awards
Most Valuable Player: Bill Russell, Boston Celtics
Rookie of the Year: Willis Reed, New York Knicks
Coach of the Year: Red Auerbach, Boston Celtics

All-NBA First Team:
F – Elgin Baylor, Los Angeles Lakers
F – Jerry Lucas, Cincinnati Royals
C – Bill Russell, Boston Celtics
G – Oscar Robertson, Cincinnati Royals
G – Jerry West, Los Angeles Lakers

All-NBA Second Team:
F – Bob Pettit, St. Louis Hawks
F – Gus Johnson, Baltimore Bullets
C – Wilt Chamberlain, Philadelphia 76ers
G – Hal Greer, Philadelphia 76ers
G – Sam Jones, Boston Celtics

NBA All-Rookie First Team:
Jim Barnes, New York Knicks
Willis Reed, New York Knicks
Wali Jones, Baltimore Bullets
Howard Komives, New York Knicks
Joe Caldwell, Detroit Pistons
Lucious Jackson, Philadelphia 76ers

References
1964–65 NBA Season Summary, basketball-reference.com. Retrieved March 31, 2010.